George McMillan may refer to:
 George McMillan (politician) (born 1943), Lieutenant Governor of Alabama
 George McMillan (footballer) (born 1930), Scottish footballer
 George McMillan (baseball) (1863–1920), Major League Baseball player
 George Bray McMillan (1916–1944), United States Army Air Forces fighter pilot

See also
 George McMillin (1889–1983), United States Navy admiral